Augusta Déjerine-Klumpke (15 October 1859 – 5 November 1927) was an American-born French medical doctor known for her work in neuroanatomy. She was the one of the first female interns to work in a hospital in Paris. She was a recipient of the Officier de la Légion d'honneur and Chevalier de la Légion d'honneur.

Early life
Klumpke was born in San Francisco, California, the daughter of Dorothea Mathilda Tolle, from New York, and John Gerard Klumpke, a businessman. Her older sister, Anna Elizabeth Klumpke, had an infection in her leg that left her with a disability. Their mother took the family to Europe for eighteen months to find physicians for Anna, leaving their father behind in San Francisco. Klumpke says her parents grew apart in her mother's absence, but a 1906 newspaper article implies that John Klumpke had an affair that ended their marriage.
After her divorce, Tolle took her children to Bad Cannstatt, Germany, and then Lausanne, Switzerland. Klumpke says that her mother suggested that she study medicine, and moved their family to Paris in October 1877 to facilitate this.

Famous Siblings
Three of Klumpke's sisters were very successful in their fields: Anna Elizabeth Klumpke as a portrait artist; Dorothea Klumpke as an astronomer, and the first woman with a degree in mathematics from the Sorbonne; and Julia Klumpke as a violinist, noted for studying with Eugène Ysaÿe. A fifth sister, Mathilda Klumpke, studied piano, but died of diphtheria at the age of 30. Their brother, John William Klumpke, became an engineer.

Medical Training
Initially, Klumpke trained at the Faculty of Medicine in Paris, while taking science classes at the Sorbonne and working at the laboratories of the Museum of Natural History. She then studied anatomy and dissection, receiving a prize for her skills. She started applying for hospital externships, for further study, but was rejected repeatedly as a woman.
In 1880, she started an internship at the Charité Hospital in Berlin. The head of the clinic was Joseph Jules Dejerine, ten years her senior, and her future husband. She then went to Saint-Louis Hospital in Paris to study obstetrics and pediatrics.  
In 1882, Blanche Edwards-Pillet petitioned before the Paris municipal council, and finally the rules were changed, allowing women to compete for externships. Edwards and Klumpke became the first women externs in Paris Hospitals.

Studies of Neuroanatomy
During her externship, Klumpke attended neurology lessons with Jean-Martin Charcot and began to study the anatomy of the brachial plexus under her mentor, Alfred Vulpian. In 1883, she saw a child with a brachial plexus palsy, but unusual miosis of the eye on that side of the body. She based her medical thesis on the study and description of this phenomenon - now called Klumpke paralysis. Because of the petitions of Blanche Edwards-Pillet, she was able to publish this thesis in 1885, and in 1886 she won the Godard Prize of the Academy of Medicine. Her doctoral thesis, ‘Des polynévrites en général et des paralysies et atrophies saturnines en particulier. Etude clinique et anatomo-pathologique’ (About polyneuritis in general, and Saturnian palsies and atrophies in particular: Clinical and anatomopathological study) was accepted in 1889, and won the silver medal at the Paris Faculty of Medicine and the 1890 Lallemand Prize of the Academy of Sciences.

Marriage and Work with Jules Dejerine
In 1888, she married Joseph Jules Dejerine. Together, they worked to determine and describe the anatomy of the central and peripheral nervous systems, along with the neuropathology of injury. While Dejerine-Klumpke, as she was now known, was listed as a collaborator on Dejerine's seminal two-volume textbook of neuroanatomy Anatomie des Centres Nerveux, and his second textbook Sémiologie des affections du système nerveux, his student André Thomas wrote that she was involved in every aspect, including in conception and synthesis of the data. She was additionally an author or co-author on more than 56 papers between the years of 1885-1926.

The Dejerines had a daughter, Yvonne (1891-1986), who became a neurologist, and married a surgeon, Etienne-Pierre Sorrel. She helped preserve her father's work through the Dejerine Foundation.

Eviction from the Salpêtrière
Joseph Jules Dejerine was, like Klumpke, a student of Alfred Vulpian. Competing neurologists studied under Jean-Martin Charcot, including Pierre Marie. In 1892, Dejerine challenged Marie to a duel over their publications on the etiology of sensory ataxia. No shots were fired, but the men remained rivals for life.

Charcot died in 1893, and his position as chair of neurology at the Hospital de la Salpêtrière (Pitié-Salpêtrière Hospital) was given to Fulgence Raymond. After Raymond's death in 1910, Dejerine became chair.

When Dejerine died in 1917, Marie became chair. He gave Dejerine-Klumpke 15 days to clear out her husband's documents and leave. She instead transferred all of Dejerine's materials from the neurology department to the pathology department. She started the Dejerine Foundation with their daughter Yvonne to preserve Dejerine's work. She then worked as a medical officer in the Hôtel National des Invalides, where she earned the French Medal of Honor, and was promoted to Officer of the Legion of Honour.

Death
She died of breast cancer in 1927, and is buried beside her brother, John William Klumpke, her husband Joseph Jules Dejerine and her mother Dorothea Tolle in Paris's Pere Lachaise Cemetery.

Honors, Societies and Awards
The French Biology Society (the first elected female member) 
The French Neurology Society (the first elected female member and the first female president in 1914)
1886 Godard Prize of the Academy of Medicine
1890 Lallemand Prize of the Academy of Sciences
Officer of the Legion of Honour
Knight of the Legion of Honour

In Popular Culture
Klumpke and her sisters - especially the astronomer Dorothea Klumpke - were featured in society articles in newspapers of the early 1900s as members of a "gifted family" and "the most remarkable group of sisters in the world."

Passion Neurologie: Jules et Augusta Dejerine, a book by Michel Fardeau, focuses on the love affair between Augusta Klumpke and Jules Dejerine.

As one of the earliest female neurologists, Klumpke is featured in two neurologically-themed educational card games, The Plexus and Endowed Chairs: Neurology

Selected works
 Des polynévrites en général et des paralysies et atrophies saturnines en particulier : étude clinique et anatomo-pathologique
 Anatomie des Centres Nerveux (with Joseph Jules Dejerine)
 Sémiologie des affections du système nerveux (with Joseph Jules Dejerine)

References

Further reading

1859 births
1927 deaths
American neurologists
Women neurologists
French neurologists
French women neuroscientists
Burials at Père Lachaise Cemetery
People from San Francisco
Physicians from California
American expatriates in France
Chevaliers of the Légion d'honneur
19th-century American physicians
20th-century American physicians
19th-century French physicians
20th-century French physicians
20th-century American women physicians
19th-century American women physicians
20th-century French women